Web SQL Database is a deprecated web browser API specification for storing data in databases that can be queried using SQL variant.

The API is supported by Google Chrome, Opera, Microsoft Edge, and the Android Browser, albeit support is slowly being phased out. Web SQL was deprecated and removed for third-party contexts in Chromium 97. Web SQL access in insecure contexts is deprecated as of Chromium 105 at which time a warning message will be shown in the Chrome DevTools Issue panel.

The W3C Web Applications Working Group ceased working on the specification in November 2010, citing a lack of independent implementations (i.e. using database system other than SQLite as the backend) as the reason the specification could not move forward to become a W3C Recommendation. 

Mozilla Corporation was one of the major voices behind the break-up of negotiations and deprecation of the standard, while at the same time being the main proponents behind an 'alternative storage' standard, IndexedDB. Mozilla's argument against it becoming a standard was because it would codify the quirks of SQLite.

See also
 HTML5
 Indexed Database API
 Web Storage

References

External links
 W3C Web SQL Database Working Draft
 Web SQL database at Info-Q
 SQL storage at Can-I-Use

Database APIs
World Wide Web Consortium standards